Vase with lid is a 1926 vase by René Crevel. It is in the collection of the Metropolitan Museum of Art.

Creation 
Crevel designed the decorative painting, which was replicated and painted on a stock porcelain blank by a craftsman at the Sèvres workshops located near Paris.

In 1925, Crevel was awarded the commission to decorate the ceramics pavilion of the International Exposition of Modern Industrial and Decorative Arts in Paris. In addition to creating decorative wallpaper and panels, Cervel painted and designed six vases to be produced by acclaimed French porcelain manufacturers. The painting style on this series of Art Deco vases combines the landscape and figurative genres.

Description and interpretation 
The vase is of glazed porcelain and painted in a Fauvist style.

References 

Created via preloaddraft
Ceramics of the Metropolitan Museum of Art
Porcelain of France
Individual vases
Art Deco